The men's coxed four competition at the 1992 Summer Olympics took place at took place at Lake of Banyoles, Spain. It was held from 27 July to 1 August. There were 12 boats (60 competitors) from 12 nations, with each nation limited to a single boat in the event. The event was won by Romania, the nation's first victory in the event; the Romanian team had taken silver in 1988. Germany, recently re-united, took silver in 1992; East Germany had won gold in 1988. Two men returned from the 1988 podium to medal again in 1992: Dimitrie Popescu of Romania and Hendrik Reiher of the former East German team. They were the eighth and ninth men to earn multiple medals in the event; due to the removal of the men's coxed four from the programme, they would be the last. Bronze went to Poland, the nation's fourth bronze medal in the coxed four.

Background

This was the 19th and final appearance of the event. Rowing had been on the programme in 1896 but was cancelled due to bad weather. The coxed four was one of the four initial events introduced in 1900. It was not held in 1904 or 1908, but was held at every Games from 1912 to 1992 when it (along with the men's coxed pair) was replaced with the men's lightweight double sculls and men's lightweight coxless four.

East Germany had been dominant prior to the reunification of Germany, winning gold at the 1980 and 1988 Olympics (missing 1984 due to the Soviet-led boycott) and winning 8 of the 11 World Championships from 1977 to 1990 (with a second and third place finish as well). Germany won the only World Championship between reunification and the Games, in 1991, and was favoured in Barcelona. Romania was a strong challenger; the Romanians had won the 1989 World Championship as well as finishing second in both the 1988 Olympics and the most recent (1991) World Championship.

The People's Republic of China and Croatia each made their debut in the event; some former Soviet republics competed together as the Unified Team. The United States made its 16th appearance, most of any nation.

Competition format

The coxed four event featured five-person boats, with four rowers and a coxswain. It was a sweep rowing event, with the rowers each having one oar (and thus each rowing on one side). The competition used the 2000 metres distance that became standard at the 1912 Olympics and which has been used ever since except at the 1948 Games.

The competition consisted of two main rounds (semifinals and finals) as well as a repechage. The 12 boats were divided into two heats for the semifinals, with 6 boats in each heat. The winner of each heat (2 boats total) advanced directly to the "A" final to compete for medals and 4th through 6th place. The remaining 10 boats were placed in the repechage. The repechage featured two heats, with 5 boats in each heat. The top two boats in each repechage heat (4 boats total) advanced to the "A" final. The remaining 6 boats in the repechage (3rd, 4th, and 5th placers) were placed in the "B" final to compete for 7th through 12th places.

Schedule

All times are Central European Summer Time (UTC+2)

Results

Semifinals

Semifinal 1

Semifinal 2

Repechage

Repechage heat 1

Repechage heat 2

Finals

Final B

Final A

Final classification

The following rowers took part:

References

Rowing at the 1992 Summer Olympics
Men's events at the 1992 Summer Olympics